Sarnowo  is a village in the administrative district of Gmina Kozłowo, within Nidzica County, Warmian-Masurian Voivodeship, in northern Poland.

The village has a population of 420.

References

Sarnowo